Jubin Nautiyal is an Indian playback singer and performer. He made his debut in Bollywood by singing "Ek Mulaqat" from Sonali Cable in 2014, which was an instant hit. He mostly sings in Hindi and has also made songs in other Indian languages like Telugu, Bengali and Kannada.His newly super hit song "Mast Nazron Se" has been released.

Jubin Nautiyal has sung 27 Recreated songs.

Hindi songs

TV and web series

Films and non-film songs (those not featuring Nautiyal)

Replaced songs

Hollywood songs

Telugu songs

Kannada songs

Bengali songs

Non-film songs (featuring Nautiyal)

See also
 List of songs recorded by Arijit Singh
 List of songs recorded by Armaan Malik
 List of songs recorded by Ankit Tiwari

References 

Lists of songs recorded by Indian singers